Sun Dogs is a 2006 documentary film directed by Andrea Stewart and distributed by Palm Pictures.

Synopsis
Rescued from the mean streets and animal shelters of Kingston, 12 stray dogs are trained to be the stars of Jamaica’s first dogsled racing team. The crew, spearheaded by pop superstar Jimmy Buffett, brings the unlikely meeting of a traditionally snow-bound sport to the sand and surf.

The team's dog mushers are given the opportunity of a lifetime as they cultivate their love of animals while receiving an education and traveling the world. The film features interviews with the founder of the Jamaica Dogsled Team and footage of their training.

External links

2006 films
Canadian sports documentary films
English-language Canadian films
American sports documentary films
Documentary films about dogs
Dog sledding
Films shot in Jamaica
Films set in Jamaica
2000s English-language films
2000s American films
2000s Canadian films